The Leningrad City Chess Championship is a chess tournament held officially in the city of Leningrad, Russia starting from 1920. The city was called Petrograd from 1914 to 1924, then Leningrad until 1991, and Saint Petersburg afterwards. Only players born or living in or around the city were allowed to participate in this event. 

The championship continued to be played, in spite of tremendous difficulties, also during the siege of Leningrad in the Second World War, though the tournament of 1941 could not be finished and that of 1942, the most difficult year of the blockade, could not be organized. 

The winners include World champions Mikhail Botvinnik (1931 and 1932), Boris Spassky (1959 and 1961) and FIDE World Champion Alexander Khalifman (1996 and 1997).

List of winners  

{| class="sortable wikitable"
! # !! Year !! Winner
|-
| 1 ||1920 ||Ilya Rabinovich
|-
| 2 ||1922 || Grigory Levenfish
|-
| 3 ||1924 || Grigory Levenfish
|-
| 4 ||1925 || Ilya Rabinovich  Peter Romanovsky  Alexander Ilyin-Genevsky  Grigory Levenfish
|-
| 5 ||1926 || Alexander Ilyin-Genevsky
|-
| 6 ||1928 || Ilya Rabinovich
|-
| 7 ||1929 || Alexander Ilyin-Genevsky
|-
| 8 ||1931 || Mikhail Botvinnik
|-
| 9 ||1932 || Mikhail Botvinnik
|-
| 10 ||1933-4 || Vladimir Alatortsev  Georgy Lisitsin
|-
| 11 ||1936 || Viacheslav Ragozin
|-
| 12 ||1937 || Dmitry Ossipovich Rovner  Alexander Tolush Vitaly Chekhover
|-
| 13 ||1938 || Alexander Tolush
|-
| 14 ||1939 || Georgy Lisitsin
|-
| 15 ||1940 || Ilya Rabinovich
|-
| 16 ||1941 || align=center | unfinished
|-
| 17 ||1943 ||Fedor Sklyarov
|-
| 18 ||1944 ||Abram Model
|-
| 19 ||1945 || Viacheslav Ragozin
|-
| 20 ||1946 || Alexander Tolush
|-
| 21 ||1947 || Georgy Lisitsin  Alexander Tolush
|-
| 22 ||1948 ||Mark Taimanov
|-
| 23 ||1949 || Vitaly Chekhover
|-
| 24 ||1950 || Mark Taimanov
|-
| 25 ||1952 || Mark Taimanov
|-
| 26 ||1953 || Semyon Furman
|-
| 27 ||1954 || Nikolai Georgiyevich Kopilov
|-
| 28 ||1955 || Viktor Korchnoi
|-
| 29 ||1956 || Pavel Yevseyevich Kondratiev
|-
| 30 ||1957 || Viktor Korchnoi  Semyon Furman
|-
| 31 ||1958 || Igor Georgyevich Rubel
|-
| 32 ||1959 || Boris Spassky
|-
| 33 ||1960 || Vladimir Vasilyevich Shishkin
|-
| 34 ||1961 || Boris Spassky  Mark Taimanov
|-
| 35 ||1962 || Konstatin Mikhailovich Klaman
|-
| 36 ||1963 || Boris Timofeyevich Vladimirov
|-
| 37 ||1964 || Viktor Korchnoi
|-
| 38 ||1965 || Vadim Zelmanovich Faibisovich
|-
| 39 ||1966 || Evgeny Ruban
|-
| 40 ||1967 ||Alexander Cherepkov
|-
| 41 ||1968 || Alexander Cherepkov
|-
| 42 ||1969 || Vadim Zelmanovich Faibisovich
|-
| 43 ||1970|| Vladimir Ivanovich Karasev
|-
| 44 ||1971 || Viacheslav Osnos
|-
| 45 ||1972 || Andrey Lukin
|-
| 46 ||1973 || Mark Taimanov
|-
| 47 ||1974 || Vladimir Ivanovich Karasev
|-
| 48 ||1975 || Mark Tseitlin
|-
| 49 ||1976 || Mark Tseitlin
|-
| 50 ||1977 || Vadim Zelmanovich Faibisovich
|-
| 51 ||1978 || Mark Tseitlin  Andrey Lukin
|-
| 52 ||1979 || Igor Alexeyevich Polovodin
|-
| 53 ||1980 || Viacheslav Osnos
|-
| 54 ||1981 || Andrey Lukin
|-
| 55 ||1982 ||Alexander Cherepkov
|-
| 56 ||1983 || Andrey Lukin
|-
| 57 ||1984|| Leonid Yudasin
|-
| 58 ||1985 || Alex Yermolinsky  Vladislav Vorotnikov
|-
| 59 ||1986 || Evgeniy Solozhenkin
|-
| 60 ||1987 || Vladimir Epishin
|-
| 61 ||1988 || Andrey Lukin
|-
| 62||1989 || Alexey Yuneev
|-
| 63||1990 || Konstantin Sakaev  A. Ivanov
|-
| 64||1991 || Sergey Ivanov
|-
| 65||1992 || Sergey Ivanov
|-
| 66||1993 || Vasily Yemelin
|-
| 67||1994 || Sergey Ivanov
|-
| 68||1995 || Peter Svidler
|-
| 69||1996 || Alexander Khalifman
|-
| 70||1997 || Alexander Khalifman
|-
| 71||1998 || Evgeniy Solozhenkin
|-
| 72||1999 || Evgeny Shaposhnikov
|-
| 73||2000 || Valery Loginov
|-
| 74||2001 || Valerij Popov
|-
| 75||2002 || Vasily Yemelin 
|-
| 76 || 2003 || Denis Yevseev
|-
| 77 || 2004 || Valery Loginov
|-
| 78 || 2005 || Valery Loginov
|-
| 79 || 2006 || Valerij Popov
|-
| 80 || 2007 || Marat Makarov
|-
| 81 ||2008|| Alexey Goganov
|-
| 82 || 2009 || Maxim Matlakov
|-
| 83 || 2010 || Ildar Khairullin
|-
| 84 || 2011 || Vasily Yemelin
|-
| 85 || 2012 || Aleksandr Shimanov
|-
| 86 || 2013 || Denis Yevseev
|-
| 87 || 2014 || Denis Yevseev on tiebreak over Valerij Popov
|-
| 88 || 2015 || Alexey Zenzera
|-
| 89 || 2016 || Alexey Goganov
|-
| 90 || 2017 || Evgeny Alekseev
|-
| 91 || 2018 || Sergei Lobanov
|-
| 92 || 2019 || Evgeny A. Levin
|}

Notes

References
 (results through 1985)
Champions of Leningrad (results up until 2002)
Winnerslist from ruschess (up until 1997)
RUSBASE, part V
The 71st Championship of Saint-Petersburg
The 72nd Championship of Saint-Petersburg
The 73rd Championship of Saint-Petersburg
The 74th Championship of Saint-Petersburg
The 75th Championship of Saint-Petersburg
The 76th Championship of Saint-Petersburg
The 77th Championship of Saint-Petersburg
The 78th Championship of Saint-Petersburg
The 79th Championship of Saint-Petersburg
The 80th Championship of Saint-Petersburg
82nd St Petersburg Championship
83rd St Petersburg Championship 2010
84th ch-St Petersburg
85th St Petersburg Championship 2012
86th ch-St Petersburg

Chess competitions
Chess in Russia
Sports competitions in Saint Petersburg